Abraham Willemsens or Abraham Willemsen (c. 1605-1610 - 1672), was a Flemish painter of history and genre paintings.  His genre scenes were reminiscent of the style of the Le Nain brothers.  He also produced copies after the works of Rubens.

Life
Details about his early life such as his birth date and place are unknown.  In 1627-1628 he is recorded in the Antwerp Guild of Saint Luke as a pupil of Gilliam Antonissens (also called Guillaume Anthoni), a French painter active in Antwerp.  Willemsens married Maria de Lang. In 1645, he was elected dean of the Guild.  He was recorded in Paris the same year.

It is assumed that he operated a big workshop with a large output to supply the export market.  As a result, a large number of his paintings can be found in Spain.  He was recorded in the archives of the prominent Antwerp art dealer Guillam Forchondt in 1669 and also worked for the art dealer Matthijs Musson.  He was active as an art dealer himself.  He had two apprentices, respectively in the years 1651/52 and in 1654/55.

He died in Antwerp.

Work
The painter was virtually unknown until the discovery in the early 1990s of a painting bearing his full signature.  Since then his oeuvre has gradually been reconstituted.  Numerous attribution issues had to be dealt with as Willemsens was not the only contemporary painter who used the monogram AW.  The artists Artus Wolffort and Adriaen Willemhoudt also signed with the monogram AW. The monogrammist AW who was responsible for a number of oil on copper paintings held by the Prado Museum has now been conclusively identified as Adriaen Willemhoudt.  Because of the similarity in style there have also been misattributions of Willemsens' work to Willem van Herp.

Willemsens has further been identified with the anonymous master previously referred to as the Master of the Béguins.  This notname was given to this anonymous master active in Paris in the mid 17th century because he often depicted beguines.  The style of this master's works were grouped because of their subject matter and their closeness in style to that of the Le Nain brothers..  The identification of Willemsens with the Master of the Béguins has not been unanimously accepted in the art historical community.

Willemsens is recorded in Paris around 1645 and this can explain the influence of the Le Nain brothers who were active in Paris at that time where they painted peasant scenes.  Aside from the subject matter, another reason why Willemsens' work has often been misattributed to the Le Nains is that, like the Le Nains, he habitually used coarse linen as the canvas support.

In response to the contemporary demand for copies of Rubens' oil sketches, Willemsens produced a large number of copies of Rubens' work.  Willemsens was together with Pieter van Lint and Willem van Herp one of the principal producers of such copies for the Antwerp art dealers.  In addition to copies after Rubens, Willemsens painted landscapes on copper, often animated with religious or genre scenes.  His figures were derived primarily from paintings by Rubens, Hendrick van Balen and Gerard Seghers.  Willemsens also took inspiration from Jan Brueghel the Elder, Frans Francken the Elder and the Le Nain brothers.

References

Links

External links

Flemish Baroque painters
Painters from Antwerp
1672 deaths
Date of birth unknown
Year of birth uncertain